The Cure is a  long river in central France, a right-bank tributary of the Yonne. Its source is in Gien-sur-Cure, in the Morvan hills. It flows into the Yonne at Cravant near Vermenton.

Communes crossed 
It crosses the following departments and towns: (from its source to its confluence):

 Anost (source, Saône-et-Loire)
 Planchez (Nièvre)
 Gien-sur-Cure (Nièvre)
 Moux-en-Morvan (lac des Settons, Nièvre)
 Montsauche-les-Settons (lac des Settons, Nièvre)
 Gouloux (Nièvre)
 Saint-Brisson (Nièvre)
 Dun-les-Places (Nièvre)
 Quarré-les-Tombes (Yonne)
 Marigny-l'Eglise (lac du Crescent, Nièvre)
 Saint-Germain-des-Champs (Yonne)
 Chastellux-sur-Cure (Yonne)
 Saint-André-en-Morvan (Nièvre)
 Domecy-sur-Cure (Yonne)
 Pierre-Perthuis (Yonne)
 Foissy-les-Vezelay (Yonne)
 Saint-Père (near Vézelay, Yonne)
 Asquins (Yonne)
 Montillot (Yonne)
 Givry (Yonne)
 Blannay (Yonne)
 Sermizelles (Yonne)
 Voutenay-sur-Cure (Yonne)
 Saint-Moré (Yonne)
 Arcy-sur-Cure (Yonne)
 Bessy-sur-Cure (Yonne)
 Lucy-sur-Cure (Yonne)
 Vermenton (Yonne)
 Accolay (Yonne)
 Cravant (Yonne)

References

Rivers of France
Rivers of Bourgogne-Franche-Comté
Rivers of Nièvre
Rivers of Yonne